This is a list of the former Estonian commanders, which also includes the Estonian officers who have served in the Imperial Russian Army, Wehrmacht, Waffen SS and the military commanders, who have retired since the restoration of the Republic of Estonia in 1991:

Generals
 Generals and Admirals

 Johan Laidoner
 Aleksander Einseln
 Ants Laaneots
 Riho Terras

 Lieutenant Generals and Vice Admirals

 Paul Lill
 Nikolai Reek
 Gustav Jonson
 Johannes Kert
 Tarmo Kõuts; (Merevägi)

 Major Generals and Rear Admirals 

Ernst Põdder
Aleksander Tõnisson
Jaan Soots
Otto Heinze
Andres Larka
Johannes Orasmaa
Johannes Soodla
Herbert Brede
Aleksander Silberg 
Dimitri Lebedev 
Werner Zoege von Manteuffel 
Aleksander Paldrok 
Ludvig Puusepp 
Johan Unt 
Artur Lossmann 
Juhan Tõrvand 
Gustav Kunnos
Gustav Jonson  
Tõnis Rotberg 
Ants Kurvits 
Rudolf Reimann 
Hans Leesment
Jaan Kruus 
Aleksander Pulk 
Otto Sternbeck 
Voldemar Rieberg 
Hugo Kauler 
Martin Jervan 
Nikolai Helk 
August Traksmaa 
Aleksander Jaakson 
Richard Tomberg
August Kasekamp 
Jaan Lukas
Jaan Maide
Ants Kurvits
Hugo-Eduard Kauler
Harry Hein
Neeme Väli

Hermann Salza; (Merevägi)
Johan Pitka; (Merevägi)

Teo Krüüner; (Õhuvägi)
Vello Loemaa; (Õhuvägi)
Valeri Saar; (Õhuvägi)

 Brigadier-Generals and Commodores 

 Märt Tiru
 Alar Laneman
 Urmas Roosimägi
 Peeter Hoppe

Officers

 Karl Parts
 Viktor Puskar
 Alfons Rebane
 Jaan Usin
 Leo Kunnas
 Harald Riipalu
 Ain-Erwin Mere
Paul Maitla
 Aleksander Warma; (Merevägi)

Junior officers

 Anton Irv
 Harald Nugiseks
 Julius Kuperjanov
 Artur Sirk
 Jaan Mahlapuu (fighter pilot)

See also

 Military of Estonia
 List of Estonian commanders
 Military of Latvia
 List of former Latvian commanders
 Military of Lithuania
 List of former Lithuanian commanders

Notes and references

Estonian military leaders